The George Inn, or The George, is a public house established in the medieval period on Borough High Street in Southwark, London, owned and leased by the National Trust.

History

The pub was formerly known as the George and Dragon, named after the legend of Saint George and the Dragon. It is possible that it was used for Elizabethan theatrical productions (Inn-yard theatre), as other galleried inns were.

A pub has existed on the site since medieval times. But in 1677, it was rebuilt after a serious fire destroyed most of Southwark. The medieval pub was situated next door to an inn where Chaucer set The Canterbury Tales.

Later, the Great Northern Railway used the George as a depot and pulled down two of its fronts to build warehousing. Now just the south face remains.

Charles Dickens visited The George, and referred to it in both Little Dorrit and Our Mutual Friend.

Description
The building is partly timber framed.
The ground floor is divided into a number of connected bars. The Parliament Bar used to be a waiting room for passengers on coaches. The Middle Bar was the Coffee Room, which was frequented by Charles Dickens. The bedrooms, now a restaurant, were upstairs in the galleried part of the building.

It is the only surviving galleried coaching inn in London. The White Hart was immediately to the north but was demolished in the nineteenth century. Immediately to the south was The Tabard (which was described in Chaucer's The Canterbury Tales); it too was demolished in the nineteenth century.

The building is listed Grade I on the National Heritage List for England, and is listed in the Campaign for Real Ale's National Inventory of Historic Pub Interiors.

Gallery

References

Further reading

External links

 George Inn information at the National Trust

Grade I listed buildings in the London Borough of Southwark
Grade I listed pubs in London
National Inventory Pubs
National Trust properties in London
Pubs in the London Borough of Southwark
Buildings and structures completed in 1676
Timber framed buildings in London
Timber framed pubs in England
George Inn
1676 establishments in England
17th-century architecture in the United Kingdom
Coaching inns
Saint George and the Dragon